San Antonio Suchitepéquez is a town, with a population of 13,666 (2018 census), and a municipality in the Suchitepéquez department of Guatemala. The municipality is located at an elevation of 300 metres to 500 metres above sea level. It has a population of 59,184 (2018 census) and covers an area of 82.8 km².

See also
Centro de Agricultura Tropical Bulbuxyá

References

External links
Muni in Spanish

Municipalities of the Suchitepéquez Department